The Lausenbach is a river of Saxony, Germany. It is a tributary of the Große Röder, which it joins in Ottendorf-Okrilla.

See also
List of rivers of Saxony

Rivers of Saxony
Rivers of Germany